What's Your Rupture? is a New York-based independent record label, that specializes in small-run vinyl releases. The label gained recognition in 2005 with the release of Love Is All's Nine Times That Same Song, and a 12" release of Giddy Stratospheres from The Long Blondes. The Love Is All record was subsequently released in the UK by Parlophone under the What's Your Rupture? imprint.

Notable recording artists
Love Is All
The Long Blondes
Comet Gain
Think About Life
Fucked Up
Iceage
Parquet Courts
Royal Headache
Bodega

References

External links
 Official site
 Twitter account
 Myspace page

Indie rock record labels
American independent record labels